Epigomphus donnellyi is a species of dragonfly in the family Gomphidae. It is endemic to Mexico, where it inhabits the Sierra de los Tuxtlas of southern Veracruz state. Its natural habitats are subtropical or tropical moist lowland forests and rivers. It is threatened by habitat loss.

References

Sources

Gomphidae
Endemic insects of Mexico
Endemic fauna of Los Tuxtlas
Insects described in 1988
Taxonomy articles created by Polbot